José Ramalho (born 15 March 1901, date of death unknown) was a Brazilian rower. He competed at the 1932 Summer Olympics and the 1936 Summer Olympics.

References

1901 births
Year of death missing
Brazilian male rowers
Olympic rowers of Brazil
Rowers at the 1932 Summer Olympics
Rowers at the 1936 Summer Olympics
Sportspeople from Curitiba